Prarthana is a 1978 Indian Malayalam-language film, directed by A. B. Raj and produced by T. K. Balachandran. The film stars Prem Nazir, Jayabharathi, Kaviyoor Ponnamma and Sankaradi. The film's score was composed by V. Dakshinamoorthy.

Cast
Prem Nazir 
Jayabharathi 
Kaviyoor Ponnamma 
Sankaradi 
Sukumaran 
Poojappura Ravi 
Reena

Soundtrack
The music was composed by V. Dakshinamoorthy with lyrics by Mankombu Gopalakrishnan.

References

External links
 

1978 films
1970s Malayalam-language films